Ostension: Word Learning and the Embodied Mind is a 2014 book by Chad Engelland in which the author provides a philosophical introduction to ostension and its significance in word learning.

References

External links
Ostension: Word Learning and the Embodied Mind

2014 non-fiction books
MIT Press books
Definition